Río Cañas is a river in Ponce, Puerto Rico.  It is a tributary of the Río Matilde.

Río Cañas may also refer to:

Rivers
 Río Cañas (Aguada, Puerto Rico), a tributary of the Río Culebrinas
 Río Cañas (Caguas, Puerto Rico), a tributary of the Río Grande de Loiza
 Río Cañas (Juana Diaz, Puerto Rico), a river reaching the Caribbean Sea
 Río Cañas (Mayagüez, Puerto Rico), a tributary of the Río Grande de Añasco
 Río Cañas (Naranjito, Puerto Rico), a tributary of the Río de la Plata
 Río Cañas (Sabana Grande, Puerto Rico), a tributary of the Río Loco

Places
 Río Cañas, Añasco, Puerto Rico, a barrio
 Río Cañas, Caguas, Puerto Rico, a barrio
 Río Cañas, Las Marías, Puerto Rico, a barrio 
 Río Cañas Abajo, Juana Díaz, Puerto Rico, a barrio 
 Río Cañas Abajo, Mayagüez, Puerto Rico, a barrio 
 Río Cañas Arriba, Juana Díaz, Puerto Rico, a barrio 
 Río Cañas Arriba, Mayagüez, Puerto Rico, a barrio

See also
 Cañas River (disambiguation)
 Canoas River (disambiguation)